A differential refractometer (DRI), or refractive index detector (RI or RID) is a detector that measures the refractive index of an analyte relative to the solvent.  They are often used as detectors for high-performance liquid chromatography and size exclusion chromatography.  They are considered to be universal detectors because they can detect anything with a refractive index different from the solvent, but they have low sensitivity.

Principles of operation

When light leaves one material and enters another it bends, or refracts.  The refractive index of a material is a measure of how much light bends when it enters.  Differential refractometers contain a flow cell with two parts: one for the sample and one for the reference solvent.  The detector measures the refractive index of both components.  When only solvent is passing through the sample component the measured refractive index of both components is the same, but when an analyte passes through the flow cell the two measured refractive index are different. The difference appears as a peak in the chromatogram.

Applications

Differential refractometers are often used for the analysis of polymer samples in size exclusion chromatography.

References

Measuring instruments